Théodrate of Troyes (868 — 903) was the wife of Odo, Count of Paris and Queen consort of Western Francia from 888 to 898. Evidence of Théodrate and Odo's children comes from non-contemporary or historically inauthentic sources. The eleventh-century chronicler Adémar de Chabannes wrote that they had a son, Arnoul (c.882-898), who died shortly after his father Odo. Guy is named as one of the couple's children in an Alan I's charter dated 28 August 903, but genealogist  Christian Settipani says it's a falsification.

References

|-

Frankish queens consort
Countesses of Paris
French queens consort
868 births
903 deaths
9th-century French women
9th-century people from West Francia
Women from the Carolingian Empire